Louredo may refer to the following places in Portugal:

 Louredo (Amarante), a civil parish in the municipality of Amarante
 Louredo (Paredes), a civil parish in the municipality of Paredes 
 Louredo (Póvoa de Lanhoso), a civil parish in the municipality of Póvoa de Lanhoso
 Louredo (Santa Maria da Feira), a civil parish in the municipality of Santa Maria da Feira 
 Louredo (Santa Marta de Penaguião), a civil parish in the municipality of Santa Marta de Penaguião
 Louredo (Vieira do Minho), a civil parish in the municipality of Vieira do Minho